Alanyalı is a village in the Mersin Province, Turkey. It is part of Toroslar district (which is a second level municipality within Mersin city). It is situated in the Taurus Mountains. The population of the village is 139 as of 2012.

References

Villages in Toroslar District